Homotherus is a genus of parasitoid wasps belonging to the family Ichneumonidae.

The species of this genus are found in Europe and Northern America.

Species:
 Homotherus berthoumieui (Pic, 1899) 
 Homotherus erythromelas (McLachlan, 1878)

References

Ichneumonidae
Ichneumonidae genera